Metallothionein-1G is a protein that in humans is encoded by the MT1G gene.

References

Further reading

Human proteins